Benjamin Hale may refer to:

Benjamin Hale (author) (born 1983), American writer
Benjamin Hale (educator) (1797–1863), American educator and clergyman
Benjamin Hale (philosopher), American environmental philosopher and ethicist
Benjamin Hale Settle (born 1947), American judge